William Larson (October 14, 1942 - April 4, 2019) is an American photographer who has influenced the photographic world with conceptual pieces that examine the role of technology in art.

Life
Larson completed his masters from the prestigious Institute of Design in Chicago in 1968, where he studied under Harry Callahan and Aaron Siskind.  Although he began his career half a century ago, he has never stopped analyzing and experimenting with the medium of photography.

His first exploration dealt primarily with the issues of time, continuity, and movement.  Larson was one of the first to create slit-scan photographs (see strip photography), made using medium format film and a special motorized camera.  With these stretched-out images, Larson managed to portray the fluid feeling of moving cinema within a still photograph.  At the same time, he displayed his incredible technical expertise.  In his next step, Larson questioned the inherently “visual” aspect of image-making.  Fascinated by the way a fax machine could convert a photograph using audio code, he used this new technological device to create works of art.  Through the last few decades, Larson has delved into the moving image, investigating film projectors and toying with notions of video art.  He has shown at Gallery 339, in Philadelphia, and is represented by Gitterman Gallery, in New York.

Larson’s continuing innovation in the field of photography has earned him many honors in the art community.  His works can be found in many significant collections such as the George Eastman Museum, the Center for Creative Photography and the National Gallery of Australia, and in smaller quantities at the Metropolitan Museum of Art, the Museum of Modern Art, the J. Paul Getty Museum and the Philadelphia Museum of Art.

Born in North Tonawanda, NY, Larson lived and worked out of Philadelphia, PA.

Awards
He has received a Guggenheim Fellowship (1982), a Pew Fellowships in the Arts (2001), several fellowships from the National Endowment for the Arts (1995, 1994, 1992, 1971, 1979, 1986), two Pennsylvania Council on the Arts Fellowships (1988, 1983), an Aaron Siskind Foundation Fellowship (1993), and two grants from the Polaroid Corporation (1979).

References

External links
Gallery 339
Brief Article

American photographers
Living people
1942 births
Pew Fellows in the Arts
People from North Tonawanda, New York